webtrees is a free open source web-based genealogy application intended for collaborative use.

It requires a web server that has PHP and MySQL installed.

It is compatible with standard 5.5.1-GEDCOM files.

History 
webtrees is a fork of PhpGedView, it was created in early 2010, when a majority of active PhpGedView developers stopped using SourceForge 
due to issues with exporting encrypted software. webtrees is the second fork of PhpGedView. In late 2005 the first one, called Genmod, was created.

On 26 July 2010, a month before version 1.0.0 of webtrees was released, Dick Eastman, who publishes Eastman's Online Genealogy Newsletter, introduced webtrees as "the wave of the future."

The day version 1.0.0 of webtrees was released, Tamura Jones reviewed and compared Webtrees with PhpGedView.

References

External links 
 
 

Free genealogy software
PHP software
Software forks